Kinetic energy metamorphosis (KEM) is a recently discovered tribological process of gradual crystal re-orientation and foliation of component minerals in certain rocks. It is caused by very high, localized application of kinetic energy. The required energy may be provided by prolonged battery of fluvially propelled bed load of cobbles, by glacial abrasion, tectonic deformation, and even by human action. It can result in the formation of laminae on specific metamorphic rocks that, while being chemically similar to the protolith, differ significantly in appearance and in their resistance to weathering or deformation. These tectonite layers are of whitish color and tend to survive granular or mass exfoliation much longer than the surrounding protolith.

KEM in cupules

The products of KEM were first identified in 2015 in cupules, a form of rock art consisting of spherical cap or dome-shaped depressions created by percussion with hammer-stones. KEM laminae, caused by solid state re-metamorphosis of metamorphic rock, have been observed in cupules on three rock types:

 On quartzite at Indragarh Hill, Bhanpura, India; Nchwaneng, Korannaberg site complex, South Africa; and Inca Huasi, Mizque, central Bolivia.
 On sandstone at Jabal al-Raat, Shuwaymis site complex, northern Saudi Arabia; Umm Singid and Jebel as-Suqur, Sudan; Tabrakat, Acacus site complex, Libya; and Inca Huasi, Mizque, central Bolivia.
 On schist at Condor Mayu 2, Santivañez site complex, Cochabamba, Bolivia.
 On granite at Wushigou 1, Fangcheng, Henan Province, China.

Replication has established that cupules produced on very hard rocks, such as quartzite, require many tens of thousands of blows with hammer-stones to make. Therefore, the cumulative force applied to very small surface areas (<15 cm2) is in the order of tens of kN (kilo Newtons). In one extreme case, the KEM lamina has been developed to a thickness of c. 10 mm, but the most commonly observed thickness is about 1–2 mm. The tectonite layer is always thickest in the central part of the cupule, i.e. where the greatest amount of energy was applied.

Geological KEM phenomena

These phenomena have since also been observed in geological contexts, generally of three types:

 On the bedrock of paleochannels (geologically ancient river courses) that has been heavily impacted by battering with fluvial detrital loads in places of high kinetic energy, such as ancient rapids. It can even occur on the transported cobbles and boulders found deposited in such palaeochannels.
 On glacially abraded pavements of quartzite, caused by the tribological action of the lithic load of ancient glaciers.
 In the form of whitish sheets of planar or curvi-planar tectonite contained in sandstone that has been subjected to tectonic foliation.

Kinetic energy metamorphosis products are tribological phenomena, caused by very focused, localized cumulative effect of kinetic energy on the syntaxial silica (and the voids it contains) that forms the cement of such rocks as sandstones and quartzites. The conversion to tectonite does not appear to be reversible, and the high resistance of that product to weathering processes protects the parent rock it conceals from both granular and mass exfoliation. Its susceptibility to dating techniques needs to be explored.

References 

Tribology
Kinetic energy